Prim may refer to:

People
Prim (given name)
Prim (surname)

Places
Prim, Virginia, unincorporated community in King George County
Dolní Přím, village in the Czech Republic; as Nieder Prim (Lower Prim) site of the Battle of Königgrätz
Saint-Prim, commune in Isère, France
Prim (Neckar), river in Baden-Württemberg, Germany, tributary of the Neckar
Prims, river in Rhineland-Palatinate, Germany, tributary of the Saar

Other
Prim, a type of tamburica (musical instrument)
Prim or Primost, a Norwegian cheese
Prim, abbreviation for Primitive Methodist
Prim's algorithm for minimum spanning tree, developed by Robert C. Prim
PRIM (watches), a Czech trademark
Graham Street Prims F.C., football club in Derby, England
 In computers, a geometric primitive, or prim, is a simple shape used in 3D modeling to build into more complex objects.
 A Sculpted prim, in Second Life, is a 3D parametric object whose 3D shape is determined by a texture, more advanced than the game's geometric primitives
Presence and Instant Messaging or PRIM, a proposed standard protocol for instant messaging
Prim, inferred to as the "darkness behind everything" in Stephen King's novels

Prim Everdeen, a character in the Hunger Games trilogy